Choix is a small city in the Mexican state of Sinaloa. It is located inland, in the northernmost corner of the state.
The city reported 9,305 inhabitants in the 2010 census. It contains the locality Sauzadebaca.

References

External links
Government of Sinaloa

Populated places in Sinaloa
Populated places established in 1607